"Cindy" ("Cindy, Cindy") is a popular American folk song. According to John Lomax, the song originated in North Carolina. In the early and middle 20th century, "Cindy" was included in the songbooks used in many elementary school music programs as an example of folk music. One of the earliest versions of "Cindy" is found in Anne Virginia Culbertson's collection of Negro folktales (At the Big House, where Aunt Nancy and Aunt 'Phrony Held Forth on the Animal Folks, Bobbs-Merrill, 1904) where one of her characters, Tim, "sang a plantation song named 'Cindy Ann'," the first verse and refrain of which are:

As with many folk songs, each singer was free to add verses, and many did. In addition, as Byron Arnold and Bob Halli noted in An Alabama Songbook, performers could swap verses with those of other songs, including "Old Joe Clark" and "Boil Them Cabbage Down".

The tune is taken from the spiritual "The Gospel Train", also known as "Get on Board Little Children".

Recordings
Buddy Kaye, Benjamin Weisman, Dolores Fuller and Fred Wise wrote a version of "Cindy" called "Cindy, Cindy". This version is the familiar one recorded by such performers as Elvis Presley, Johnny Cash, Ricky Nelson, Warren Zevon, Nick Cave (in a duet with Johnny Cash), and others. Bing Crosby included the song in a medley on his album 101 Gang Songs (1961). Mack Wilberg's choral arrangement of the piece was written for four-hand piano, double eight-part choirs, a string bass, xylophone, and a score of quintessential Americana instruments to supplement the melody during the arrangement's hoedown section. This arrangement is available for any choir to learn and perform, although Wilberg also wrote a special arrangement to be performed by the Mormon Tabernacle Choir. The choral parts are the same, but the accompaniment has been rewritten for full orchestra (specifically the Orchestra at Temple Square). Robert Plant featured an arrangement titled "Cindy, I'll Marry You Someday" on his 2010 album Band of Joy.

Modern versions of the song include modified lyrics, such as the following:
 You ought to see my Cindy
 She lives way down South
 And she's so sweet the honey bees
 All swarm around her mouth

 Get along home Cindy, Cindy
 Get along home Cindy, Cindy
 Get along home Cindy, Cindy
 I'll marry you some day

In film and television
Van Johnson sings part of it in the 1956 movie Miracle in the Rain.

The song is performed in the 1957 episode of Maverick, "Hostage" by Don Durant.

The song is performed in the 1959 John Wayne movie Rio Bravo, by Dean Martin, Ricky Nelson and Walter Brennan.

Andy Griffith sings this song in season 3 episode 10 "Opie's Rival" of The Andy Griffith Show (1962).

On the Lawrence Welk Show episode "My Blue Heaven" (1964), Dick Dale and the Lennon Sisters perform this song.

References

Cindy
Year of song unknown
Songwriter unknown